Bonita is a feminine given name as well as a word meaning "pretty, cute" in Spanish and Portuguese. People with that name include:

 Bonita Granville, American actress and producer
 Bonnie Langford, English actress
 Bonita Pietila, American casting director and producer
 Bonita H. Valien (1912-2011), African-American sociologist

See also
 Bonita (disambiguation)

Spanish feminine given names
Feminine given names